Munanila is an administrative ward in Buhigwe District  of Kigoma Region of Tanzania. In 2016 the Tanzania National Bureau of Statistics report there were 18,760 people in the ward, from 33,782 in 2012.

Villages / neighborhoods 
The ward has 9 villages and 44 hamlets.

 Munanila 
 Bigara
 Karo
 Mawasiliano
 Rabhilo
 Nyamihini
 Kitambuka 
 Nyamisare
 Ruvumu
 Mlemle
 Mhalulo
 Cheramunda
 Kitambuka
 Mkatanga 
 Msagara
 Nayamugiha
 Muyugalilo
 Nyarukaza
 Kayombe
 Mungwanga
 Nyakimwe 
 Musha
 Kisoro
 Mugwaga
 Nyarutambwe ‘A’
 Nyarutambwe ‘B’
 Nyarutabwe 
 Gwamabunga
 Gwanilo
 Bwawani
 Nyakulazo
 Mnanila B 
 Karo
 Mguruka
 Bigara
 Legezamwendo
 Msagara 
 Nyakelu
 Mubugera
 Kungara
 Kayange
 Kishengezi 
 Milenda
 Ruchunya
 Mlambi
 Mrukaza
 Mkwabule
 Kiyange
 Kafene 
 Kachelele
 Mkatanga
 Nyamaguge
 Kumsenga

References

Buhigwe District
Wards of Kigoma Region